The Winning Season is a 2009 American sports comedy film written and directed by James C. Strouse and starring Sam Rockwell. Premiering at the 2009 Sundance Film Festival, the film had a limited theatrical release on September 3, 2010, distributed by Lionsgate in the United Kingdom and the United States after they brought the rights to the film at Sundance. Plum Pictures and Gigi Films produced the film.

Plot
Bill Greaves, a divorced deadbeat dad, is estranged from his teenage daughter Molly. His friend Terry is a high school principal who gives him a job as the coach for the girls' varsity basketball team. Bill begins to regret his decision when he meets the girls on the team: Abbie Miller, Tamra Schemerhorn, Mindy, Wendy Webber, Lisa Robinson, and Kathy Reyes. They improve under Bill's coaching and advise him on his relationship with his daughter, but their winning season does not protect the girls from their real world difficulties.

Cast
 Sam Rockwell as Bill Greaves
 Shareeka Epps as Lisa Robinson
 Emily Rios as Kathy Reyes
 Rooney Mara as Wendy Webber
 Emma Roberts as Abbie Miller
 Meaghan Witri as Tamra Schemerhorn
 Melanie Hinkle as Mindy
 Margo Martindale as Donna
 Rob Corddry as Terry
 Jessica Hecht as Stacey
 Shana Dowdeswell as Molly Greaves
 Caitlin Colford as Trish
 Connor Paolo as Damon

Devin Ratray portrays a security officer named "Buzz", in reference to his role as "Buzz McCallister" in Home Alone (1995) and Home Alone 2: Lost in New York (1997). Ratray would subsequently reprise his role as Buzz McCallister in Home Sweet Home Alone (2021), in which Buzz is revealed to have become a police officer (and to have also formerly been employed as a security guard) since the events of the first two Home Alone films.

References

External links
 

2009 films
American sports comedy films
American basketball films
2000s sports comedy films
Films scored by Edward Shearmur
Films directed by James C. Strouse
Films set in Indiana
2009 comedy films
2000s English-language films
2000s American films